Robert Earl Jones (February 3, 1910 – September 7, 2006), sometimes credited as Earl Jones, was an American actor and professional boxer. One of the first prominent Black film stars, Jones was a living link with the Harlem Renaissance of the 1920s and 1930s, having worked with Langston Hughes early in his career.

Jones was best known for his leading roles in films such as Lying Lips (1939) and later in his career for supporting roles in films such as The Sting (1973), Trading Places (1983), The Cotton Club (1984), and Witness (1985). He was the father of actor James Earl Jones.

Biography

Early life
Jones was born in northwestern Mississippi; the specific location is unclear as some sources indicate Senatobia, while others suggest nearby Coldwater. A son of Robert and Elnora Jones, Robert Earl Jones left school at an early age to work as a sharecropper to help his family. He later became a prizefighter. Under the name "Battling Bill Stovall", he was a sparring partner of Joe Louis.

Career
Jones became interested in theater after he moved to Chicago, as one of the thousands leaving the South in the Great Migration. He moved on to New York by the 1930s. He worked with young people in the Works Progress Administration, the largest New Deal agency, through which he met Langston Hughes, a young poet and playwright. Hughes cast him in his 1938 play, Don't You Want to Be Free?.

Jones also entered the film business, appearing in more than twenty films. His film career started with the leading role of a detective in the 1939 race film Lying Lips, written and directed by Oscar Micheaux, and Jones made his next screen appearance in Micheaux's The Notorious Elinor Lee (1940). Jones acted mostly in crime movies and dramas after that, with such highlights as Wild River (1960) and One Potato, Two Potato (1964). In the Oscar-winning 1973 film The Sting, he played Luther Coleman, an aging grifter whose con is requited with murder leading to the eponymous "sting". In the later 20th century, Jones appeared in several other noted films: Trading Places (1983) and Witness (1985).

Toward the end of his life, Jones was noted for his stage portrayal of Creon in The Gospel at Colonus (1988), a black musical version of the Oedipus legend. He also appeared in episodes of the long-running TV shows Lou Grant and Kojak. One of his last stage roles was in a 1991 Broadway production of Mule Bone by Hughes and Zora Neale Hurston, another important writer of the Harlem Renaissance. His last film was Rain Without Thunder (1993).

Although blacklisted by the House Un-American Activities Committee in the 1950s due to involvement with leftist groups, Jones was ultimately honored with a lifetime achievement award by the U.S. National Black Theatre Festival.

Personal life
Jones was married three times. As a young man, he married Ruth Connolly (died 1986) in 1929; they had a son, James Earl Jones. Jones and Connolly separated before James was born in 1931, and the couple divorced in 1933. Jones did not come to know his son until the mid-1950s. Jones married two other times, to Jumelle Jones from 1938 to 1950, and Ruth Williams from 1960 until her death in 1981. He fathered a second son, Matthew Earl Jones. Jones died on September 7, 2006, in Englewood, New Jersey, from natural causes at age 96.

Work

Theatre

Filmography

Television

References

External links

 Earl Jones Institute website
 
 Robert Earl Jones profile, University of Wisconsin's Actors Studio audio collection

1910 births
2006 deaths
Actors Studio alumni
American male film actors
American male stage actors
Male actors from Mississippi
Hollywood blacklist
African-American boxers
Works Progress Administration workers
African-American male actors
American male television actors
20th-century American male actors
People from Tate County, Mississippi
American male boxers
Boxers from Mississippi
20th-century African-American sportspeople
21st-century African-American people